Chadwell Heath Academy  is a co-educational, independent of local authority school with academy status, located in Chadwell Heath in the London Borough of Redbridge, England. The school has approximately 1200 pupils on roll, including 300 in the sixth form. Each pupil is assigned to one of six form houses: Austen, Bronte, Elliot, Orwell, Paton and Swift, named after authors. The school is also the most rewarded school in the borough for specialisms. It is ranked amongst the most successful schools in the country and "well above" the national average.

The school was awarded Arts College status in 2002, and Mathematics and Computing College specialist status in 2007. It also holds the Artsmark Gold and Sportsmark accreditations. The school has been rated 'Outstanding' across all six Ofsted categories.

The school is the highest ranked non-selective school in the London Borough of Redbridge.

Like St. Paul's Girls' School, the sixth form is one of few schools in the country which does not have a prescribed school uniform.

Exam results
In 2007 the school achieved the third highest GCSE results in the borough with 96.8% of student achieving 5 A* to C grades. The only schools to beat them were the two grammar schools, Woodford County High School and Ilford County High School who achieved 100% and 99.2% 5 A* to C grades respectively.

In 2008 the pupils at the school continued the run of high grade passes with 96% achieving 5 or more A* to C grades at GCSE with 61% of grades being at A*, A and B. At AS-Level the overall pass rate was 90% and at A2-Level the pass rate was 99%

Examination results for 2009 were again high. 97% of pupils achieved at least 5 A* - C grades at GCSE with 99% achieving 5 or more A* - G grades. Over half the grades obtained were at A* A and B. 30% of pupils achieved 1 to 9 A* grades and 57% achieved 1 to 9 A* and A grades. 81% of pupils achieved 2 or more Science certificates at grades A* to C. At AS Level, 58% of the grades awarded were at A, B and C. Finally at A-Level students achieved a pass rate of 99%.
Many of the sixth form leavers continue higher education at Russel Group universities such as Bristol, Durham, Imperial College London, LSE, Oxford, UCL, Warwick and York.

Houses

The main school is split into six 'form groups'. On admission, each student is allocated a form group. The form groups are as follows:

Austen - named after Jane Austen
Bronte - named after the Brontë Sisters
Eliot - named after T. S. Eliot
Paton - named after Alan Paton
Orwell - named after George Orwell
Swift - named after Jonathan Swift

Prefects
The school employs a prefect system, where a number of pupils from year 11 are selected by teachers based on grades and characteristic to become 'prefects' and one 'head prefect'. Prefects enjoy book tokens and lunch passes. Previously year 8 students would fulfill 'reception duty'.

Feeder schools
The top feeder primary schools for entry into Chadwell Heath Academy are:

Chadwell Primary School
Barley Lane Primary School
Grove Primary School
St. Bede's Catholic School
Goodmayes Primary School

Old Chadwellites

Former pupils of the school are known as Old Chadwellites.

Notable past students at the school include Kris Chesney, the Saracens and International Rugby player who returned to open the schools new sports hall and sixth form centre in October 2007. Chesney also returned to congratulate over 100 pupils who had won awards at the schools annual prize-giving evening in November 2007.

Other notable alumni include:
Liverpool and England striker Rhian Brewster
Actor and comedian Mawaan Rizwan
Reading and England defender Nicky Shorey also attended the school.
The actress Michelle Dockery
 Musician Devonte Hynes 
 Fashion photographer Ben Rayner
 Surgeon and inventor Shafi Ahmed.
 Judge and Recorder Khatun Sapnara.
The actor Micheal Ward

References

External links
Official website

Academies in the London Borough of Redbridge
Secondary schools in the London Borough of Redbridge
Chadwell Heath